Basis theorem can refer to:

 Basis theorem (computability), a type of theorem in computability theory showing that sets from particular classes must have elements of particular kinds. 
 Hilbert's basis theorem, in algebraic geometry, says that a polynomial ring over a Noetherian ring is Noetherian.
 Low basis theorem, a particular theorem in computability theory.